Chesapeake Beach is a town in Calvert County, Maryland, United States. Its major attractions include the Chesapeake Beach Railway Station, the Chesapeake Beach Rail Trail, a water park, marinas, piers, and charter boat fishing. The town's population was recorded as 5,753 in the 2010 census.

Geography
Chesapeake Beach is located at  (38.695070, -76.536125).

The city has grown out from the intersection of Fishing Creek and the Chesapeake Bay. The creek has been dredged to allow pleasure craft, commercial fisherman and a few small US Navy vessels to dock in the city. Fishing Creek is a breeding sanctuary for Crassostrea virginica, as well as Chrysaora chesapeakei.

The southern end of the city remains heavily wooded and is distinguished by the large sandstone cliffs called the Randle Cliffs. These cliffs tower as high as 110 feet above the water and are constantly eroding due to freeze/thaw and wave action. The debris from these cliffs has formed a number of shallow sand bars which makes navigation by boat near the cliffs very difficult and the water very shallow for hundreds of yards into the bay.

Located at the center of town is the Chesapeake Beach Veterans' Memorial Park. It features a very large American flag and a waterfall fountain.

A boardwalk along the Bay spans from 17th Street, down to the southern terminus of B Street and the northern entrance to Brownies Beach/Bayfront Park.

Transportation

The primary method of travel to and from Chesapeake Beach is presently by road, and two state highways currently serve the town. Maryland Route 260 follows Chesapeake Beach Road into the town, providing a direct connection between the town and both Maryland Route 2 and Maryland Route 4. MD 2 leads north to Annapolis and Baltimore, while MD 4 heads northwest to Washington, D.C. Maryland Route 261 is the other highway directly serving the town, following Bayside Road from south to north through Chesapeake Beach and providing connections to other communities along the Chesapeake Bay. Cox Road is unsigned Maryland Route 775, and is a former alignment of MD 260.

Demographics

2010 census
As of the census of 2010, there were 5,753 people, 2,134 households, and 1,520 families residing in the town. The racial makeup of the town was 84.8% White, 9.8% African American, 0.6% Native American, 1.4% Asian, 0.6% from other races, and 2.8% from two or more races. Hispanic or Latino of any race were 2.8% of the population.

There were 2,134 households, of which 43.1% had children under the age of 18 living with them, 51.4% were married couples living together, 15.2% had a female householder with no husband present, 4.6% had a male householder with no wife present, and 28.8% were non-families. 21.6% of all households were made up of individuals, and 5.6% had someone living alone who was 65 years of age or older. The average household size was 2.70 and the average family size was 3.15.

The median age in the town was 36.2 years. 28.6% of residents were under the age of 18; 6.8% were between the ages of 18 and 24; 29.6% were from 25 to 44; 27.7% were from 45 to 64; and 7.1% were 65 years of age or older. The gender makeup of the town was 48.1% male and 51.9% female.

2000 census
As of the census of 2000, there were 3,180 people, 1,217 households, and 862 families residing in the town. The racial makeup of the town was 91.51% White, 5.28% African American, 0.35% Native American, 1.10% Asian, 0.38% from other races, and 1.38% from two or more races. Hispanic or Latino of any race were 1.42% of the population.

There were 1,217 households, out of which 35.2% had children under the age of 18 living with them, 52.7% were married couples living together, 12.9% had a female householder with no husband present, and 29.1% were non-families. 21.6% of all households were made up of individuals, and 5.4% had someone living alone who was 65 years of age or older. The average household size was 2.61 and the average family size was 3.03.

In the town, the population was spread out, with 27.2% under the age of 18, 7.4% from 18 to 24, 34.4% from 25 to 44, 24.0% from 45 to 64, and 7.0% who were 65 years of age or older. The median age was 36 years. For every 100 females, there were 99.1 males. For every 100 females age 18 and over, there were 93.8 males.

The median income for a household in the town was $68,365, and the median income for a family was $74,167. Males had a median income of $43,125 versus $35,865 for females. The per capita income for the town was $29,616. About 1.6% of families and 3.8% of the population were below the poverty line, including 3.8% of those under age 18 and 5.5% of those age 65 or over.

History

Chesapeake Beach was established as a resort community at the end of the Chesapeake Beach Railway,  a short line railroad from Washington, DC. It was the site of many slot machines in the early twentieth century (despite efforts to prohibit them) as part of the "Little Nevada" area of southern Maryland. Between steamer ships from Baltimore and trains from Washington, the weekend population of Chesapeake Beach reached into the 10,000s during the 1920s, until economic depression, and a bad hotel fire, brought an end to the railroad. The construction of the Bay Bridge to the Eastern Shore of Maryland in the 1950s enabled many of the visitors who used to spend their summers in Chesapeake Beach to now spend their time in Ocean City, Maryland instead. A museum at the old railroad station still exists today in Chesapeake Beach with many historic photos and an old passenger car from the railroad.  It was listed on the National Register of Historic Places in 1980.  In the new millennium a boardwalk and pier, and a new condominium development have risen in Chesapeake Beach.  There is also a recreational water park with water slides, a newly opened resort spa hotel, and a seafood restaurant right on the bay.  The Herrington Harbour (Rose Haven) marina resort, which was voted by Marina Dock Age magazine as the best marina in the United States, is a few miles north.

Chesapeake Beach is also host to the United States Naval Research Laboratory Chesapeake Bay Detachment that experiments with various military radar systems and fire suppression technology. Perched atop the sandstone cliffs along the Western Shore of the Chesapeake Bay the lab is able to use their radars against a variety of surface and air targets in the Bay. Nearby Naval Air Station Patuxent River has several aircraft that assist in the Research lab's mission.

Hurricane Isabel struck Chesapeake Beach and the adjacent city of North Beach, Maryland in 2003. The storm surge pushed flood waters into both towns, damaging many homes beyond repair in North Beach, and knocking out electrical services for nearly one week.

On June 4, 2008, a tornado struck Chesapeake Beach, damaging many homes in Richfield Station and Bayview Hills.

On April 3, 2019, a large townhouse fire in the Courtyards at Fishing Creek neighborhood resulted in the destruction of 2 rows of townhouses, and the deaths of a woman and her 13-year-old granddaughter.

Neighborhoods/Subdivisions
The old grid streets of the town are generally divided into the North Side and South Side. East-west-running streets are numbered 10 through 31, and north-south-running streets are lettered B through J. The North Side consists of 26th through 31st Streets and C through G Streets. The South Side consists of 10th through 19th Streets and B through J Streets. 2nd through 25th Streets are located in the Summer City community and are not within Chesapeake Beach's city limits. These streets run north-to-south like the lettered streets within the town proper. First Street is located to the north of 31st Street and is shared with North Beach. There is no 21st, 22nd or 23rd Street.

Other neighborhoods include:
The Highlands
Bayview Hills
Richfield Station
Stinnett
Courtyards at Fishing Creek 
Windward Key
Seagate Square
Bay Crest
Captain's Quarters
Chesapeake Station
Chesapeake Village 
North Calvert Woods
Randle Cliff
Brookeside
Dory Brooks
Lake Karylbrook
Locust Grove
Holiday Beach
Camp Roosevelt
Heritage Woods

Notable people
Tom Clancy, author
Thomas V. Mike Miller, Jr., president of the Maryland Senate 
Christopher Wilkinson, screenwriter, producer, and director

References

External links

 Chesapeake Beach Railway Museum
 Chesapeake Beach official website
 Chesapeake Beach Naval Research lab
 Bruce "Snake" Gabrielson Surf Art Gallery and Museum

Towns in Maryland
Towns in Calvert County, Maryland
Maryland populated places on the Chesapeake Bay
Beaches of Maryland